On the Other Side is a 2016 Croatian-Serbian drama film directed by Zrinko Ogresta. It was shown in the Panorama section at the 66th Berlin International Film Festival. The film received a Special Mention from the Europa Cinema Label jury. It was selected as the Croatian entry for the Best Foreign Language Film at the 89th Academy Awards but it was not nominated.

Cast
 Ksenija Marinković as Vesna
 Lazar Ristovski as Zarko
 Tihana Lazović as Jadranka
 Robert Budak as Vladimir
 Toni Šestan as Bozo
 Tena Jeić-Gajski as Nives
 Vinko Kraljević as Peric
 Ivan Brkić as Mato

See also
 List of submissions to the 89th Academy Awards for Best Foreign Language Film
 List of Croatian submissions for the Academy Award for Best Foreign Language Film

References

External links
 

2016 films
2016 drama films
Croatian drama films
Serbian drama films
2010s Croatian-language films
Films set in Zagreb
Films set in Belgrade